Leonie Küng (born 21 October 2000) is a Swiss tennis player. As a qualifier, she reached the singles final at the Junior Wimbledon Championships in 2018.

Küng has career-high WTA rankings of 144 in singles, achieved on 14 September 2020, and 220 in doubles, reached on 26 July 2021. To date, she has won one doubles WTA Challenger title with five singles titles and two doubles titles on the ITF Circuit.

Küng played first ITF events in Greece in 2014, and won her first $15k events in singles and doubles at the age of 17, in November 2017 in Oslo. She was the 2021 Swiss National Singles Champion, and she also won the national doubles title, partnering Ylena In-Albon.

Küng made her WTA Tour main-draw debut at the 2017 Ladies Open Biel Bienne in the doubles draw partnering Ylena In-Albon. Küng reached her maiden WTA Tour singles final at the 2020 Thailand Open by defeating three top-100 players en-route to the final.

Performance timelines

Only main-draw results in WTA Tour, Grand Slam tournaments, Billie Jean King Cup and Olympic Games are included in win–loss records.

Singles

WTA career finals

Singles: 1 runner-up

WTA 125 finals

Doubles: 1 (1 title)

ITF Circuit finals

Singles: 8 (5 titles, 3 runner-ups)

Doubles: 9 (4 titles, 5 runner-ups)

Junior Grand Slam tournament finals

Girls' singles: 1 runner–up

Notes

References

External links
 
 
 

2000 births
Living people
Swiss female tennis players